State Highway 68 (SH-68) in Tamil Nadu, India connects Cuddalore with Sankarapuram. Total length of SH-68 is 108 km.

SH-68 Route: Cuddalore - Palur - Thiruvadigai - Panruti - Arasur - Thiruvennainallur - Thirukovilur - Kadambur - Sankarapuram 

Sankarapuram Road refers to the junction of SH-68 with SH-6 (Kallakurichi - Sankarapuram - Tiruvannamalai State Highway)

External links
 Cuddalore-Sankarapuram State Highway Map

State highways in Tamil Nadu